This is a list of highest points in each county in the U.S. state of Oregon, in alphabetical order by county.

All elevations use the North American Vertical Datum of 1988 (NAVD88), the currently accepted vertical control datum for United States, Canada and Mexico. Elevations are from the National Geodetic Survey (NGS) when available. Others are from the United States Geological Survey topographic maps when available. These can be found on the Peakbagger.com web pages. Elevations from the NGS are rounded to the nearest whole number.

References
 

Highest by county
Highest
Oregon
Oregon